The two-rays ground-reflection model is a multipath radio propagation model which predicts the path losses between a transmitting antenna and a receiving antenna when they are in line of sight (LOS). Generally, the two antenna each have different height. The received signal having two components, the LOS component and the reflection component formed predominantly by a single ground reflected wave.

Mathematical derivation

From the figure the received line of sight component may be written as

and the ground reflected component may be written as

The ground reflection coefficient is

where  or  depending if the signal is horizontal or vertical polarized, respectively.  is computed as follows.

The constant  is the relative permittivity of the ground (or generally speaking, the material where the signal is being reflected),  is the angle between the ground and the reflected ray as shown in the figure above.

From the geometry of the figure, yields: 

and
,
Therefore, the path-length difference between them is

and the phase difference between the waves is

The power of the signal received is 

where  denotes average (over time) value.

Approximation
If the signal is narrow band relative to the inverse delay spread , so that , the power equation may be simplified to

where  is the transmitted power.

When distance between the antennas  is very large relative to the height of the antenna we may expand , 

using the Taylor series of :

and taking the first two terms only,

The phase difference can then be approximated as

When  is large,

 
and hence

Expanding using Taylor series

and retaining only the first two terms

it follows that

so that

which is accurate in the far field region, i.e. when  (angles are measured here in radians, not degrees) or, equivalently,

and where the combined antenna gain is the product of the transmit and receive antenna gains, . This formula was first obtained by B.A. Vvedenskij.

Note that the power decreases with as the inverse fourth power of the distance in the far field, which is explained by the destructive combination of the direct and reflected paths, which are roughly of the same in magnitude and are 180 degrees different in phase.  is called "effective isotropic radiated power" (EIRP), which is the transmit power required to produce the same received power if  the transmit antenna were isotropic.

In logarithmic units
In logarithmic units : 

Path loss :

Power vs. distance characteristics
When the distance  between antennas is less than the transmitting antenna height, two waves are added constructively to yield bigger power. As distance increases, these waves add up constructively and destructively, giving regions of up-fade and down-fade. An approximation to critical distance may be obtained by setting Δφ to π as the critical distance to a local maximum.

An extension to large antenna heights

The above approximations are valid provided that , which may be not the case in many scenarios, e.g. when antenna heights are not much smaller compared to the distance, or when the ground cannot be modelled as an ideal plane . In this case, one cannot use  and more refined analysis is required, see e.g.

Propagation modeling for high-altitude platforms, UAVs, drones, etc.

The above large antenna height extension can be used for modeling a ground-to-the-air propagation channel as in the case of an airborne communication node, e.g. an UAV , drone, high-altitude platform. When the airborne node altitude is medium to high, the relationship  does not hold anymore, the clearance angle is not  small and, consequently,     does not hold either. This has a profound impact on the propagation path loss and typical fading depth and the fading margin required for the reliable communication (low outage probability).

As a case of log distance path loss model
The standard expression of Log distance path loss model in [dB] is
 
This model is also a leading candidate for 5G and 6G systems  and is also used for indoor communications, see e.g.  and references therein.

The path loss [dB] of the 2-ray model is formally a special case with   :

,  
which is valid the far field,  = the critical distance.

As a case of multi-slope model
The 2-ray ground reflected model may be thought as a case of multi-slope model with break point at critical distance with slope 20 dB/decade before critical distance and slope of 40 dB/decade after the critical distance. Using the free-space and two-ray model above, the propagation path loss can be expressed as

Note that   and also    follow from the law of energy conservation (since the Rx power cannot exceed the Tx power) so that both   and  break down when  is small enough. This should be kept in mind when using these approximations at small distances (ignoring this limitation sometimes produces absurd results).

See also
Radio propagation model
Free-space path loss
Friis transmission equation
ITU-R P.525
Link budget
Ray tracing (physics)
Reflection (physics)
Specular reflection
Six-rays model
Ten-rays model

References

Further reading

 S. Salous, Radio Propagation Measurement and Channel Modelling, Wiley, 2013.
 J.S. Seybold, Introduction to RF propagation, Wiley, 2005.
 K. Siwiak, Radiowave Propagation and Antennas for Personal Communications, Artech House, 1998.
 M.P. Doluhanov, Radiowave Propagation, Moscow: Sviaz, 1972.
 V.V. Nikolskij, T.I. Nikolskaja, Electrodynamics and Radiowave Propagation, Moscow: Nauka, 1989.
 3GPP TR 38.901, Study on Channel Model for Frequencies from 0.5 to 100 GHz (Release 16), Sophia Antipolis, France, 2019 
 Recommendation ITU-R P.1238-8: Propagation data and prediction methods for the planning of indoor radiocommunication systems and radio local area networks in the frequency range 300 MHz to 100 GHz  
 S. Loyka, ELG4179: Wireless Communication Fundamentals, Lecture Notes (Lec. 2-4), University of Ottawa, Canada, 2021 

Radio frequency propagation model